The Babungo Museum is an art and cultural museum located in Ndop, Cameroon.

References
Museum homepage

Museums in Cameroon